The potato spindle tuber viroid (PSTVd) was the first viroid to be identified. PSTVd is a small, single stranded circular RNA molecule closely related to the chrysanthemum stunt viroid. Present within the viroidal RNA is the Pospiviroid RY motif stem loop common to its genus. The natural hosts are potatoes (Solanum tuberosum) and tomatoes (Solanum lycopersicum). All potatoes and tomatoes are susceptible to PSTVd and there is no form of natural resistance. Natural infections have also been seen in avocados and infections in other solanaceous crops have been induced in the laboratory. Until 2017 PSTVd was thought to be unable to infect Solanum sisymbriifolium. Then in May seeds exported by a Dutch company were noticed to be infected. These seeds were shipped from the company, but had been originally bred to their specifications in two Asian countries. Pstv also causes Tomato bunchy top and is seed transmitted in tomato.

Discovery 
It was discovered by Theodor Otto Diener, who is a plant pathologist at the U.S Department of Agriculture's Research Center in Beltsville, Maryland, and discovered it in 1971. He named it viroid because it is 1/80th size of a virus.

Strains and their symptoms 
Different strains of PSTVd exist and symptoms range from mild to severe. Mild strains produce no obvious symptoms. Symptoms in severe strains are dependent on environmental conditions and are most severe in hot conditions. Symptoms may be mild in initial infections but become progressively worse in the following generations. Common symptoms of severe infections include color changes in the foliage, smaller leaves and spindle-like elongation. Sprouting also occurs at a slower rate than in unaffected potatoes. Infected tomatoes are slower to show symptoms which include stunted growth with a ‘bunchy top’ caused by shortened inter-nodes. Leaves become yellow or purple and often become curled and twisted. Necrosis eventually occurs in the veins of the bottom and middle leaves and the top leaves decrease in size. Fruit ripening is also affected leading to hard, small, dark green tomatoes.

Long distance spread of PSTVd usually occurs via infected seeds but transmission via aphids (Myzus persicae) also occurs but only in the presence of PLRV (potato leaf roll virus). Mechanical transmission also occurs once it has been introduced to an area.

Primary and secondary structure of PSTVd 
PSTVd comprises 359 nucleotides.

Course of infection 
Systemic movement within the infected host is through the phloem.

References

Bibliography 

 Agrios, George N., 1936- Plant pathology (3rd edition) San Diego: Academic Press, 1988.
 Singh, R.P; Fletcher J.D.; "Background of disease (potato spindle tuber) and method of control", Agriculture and Agri food Canada, Crop & Food Research New Zealand Retrieved November 15, 2007
 DEFRA Plant Health
 "Pathogen and plant damage (potato spindle tuber)" Retrieved November 15, 2007, from George N. Agrois, Plant Pathology (3rd Ed) San Diego: Academic Press,(1988).

Viroids
Viral plant pathogens and diseases
Potato diseases
Tomato diseases